Darren Gilshenan is an Australian actor and writer. He is best known for his in television series The Moodys, Maximum Choppage, Chandon Pictures and Full Frontal.

Early life
Darren was first introduced to acting while he was a Boy Scout in Brisbane. He realised then that acting was his passion, "I just knew, I knew that's all I wanted to do. The hardest thing was trying to convince my father that my schooling TER mark didn't matter because I wanted to be an actor."

Career
Gilshenan graduated from the National Institute of Dramatic Art (NIDA) in 1988. He has also taught extensively at Australian Theatre For Young People, Bell Shakespeare and National Institute of Dramatic Art.

Gilshenan's early acting career includes guest roles in A Country Practice in 1992 and Police Rescue in 1993. He became a series regular (and writer) on the sketch comedy series Full Frontal in 1997. The show became Totally Full Frontal, where he remained as writer and actor in 1998 and 1999.

In 2002, he had a role in Dossa and Joe. He then had a major role in both seasons of Chandon Pictures, which aired from 2007 until 2009. In 2010 he guest directed Accidental Death of an Anarchist. In 2013, he starred in The Elegant Gentleman's Guide to Knife Fighting. In 2014, he starred in the comedy The Moodys and drama Rake. In 2016, he appeared on the sitcom Here Come the Habibs.

Filmography

Films

Television

References

External links
 

Year of birth missing (living people)
Australian male television actors
Helpmann Award winners
Living people